Skin cream may refer to:
Cream (pharmaceutical) in general
or specifically to moisturizer